The Lowendal Islands comprise an archipelago, with a total area of about 160 ha of land lying off the coast of Western Australia.  It is important for breeding seabirds.

Description
The archipelago lies 10 km north-east of the much larger Barrow Island, and 15 km south of the Montebello Islands, about 120 km west of the port of Dampier.  Of the 34 islands, the largest is 83 ha Varanus Island, 2.5 km long by 600 m wide.  Other large islands are Bridled (27 ha), Abutilon (27 ha), Parkinsonia (10 ha) and Beacon (1.5 ha).  Geologically, the islands are formed of uplifted and sparsely vegetated limestone.  The inshore waters of the archipelago support coral reefs as well as beds of seagrass and seaweed.  Varanus Island houses a gas separation plant, oil storage tanks and a pipeline for loading offshore tankers.

Birds
The archipelago has been identified by BirdLife International as an Important Bird Area (IBA) because it regularly supports over 1% of the world populations of crested and bridled terns.  Other seabirds recorded as having bred on the islands include wedge-tailed shearwaters, pied cormorants, roseate, lesser crested and Caspian terns, and silver gulls.

References

 
Islands of the Pilbara
Important Bird Areas of Western Australia